Doliomalus is a genus of spiders in the family Trochanteriidae. It was first described in 1897 by Simon. , it contains only one species, Doliomalus cimicoides, found in Chile.

References

Trochanteriidae
Monotypic Araneomorphae genera
Spiders of South America
Endemic fauna of Chile